— Opening lines from Gavin Douglas' Eneados, a translation, into Middle Scots of Virgil's Aeneid

Events
 Joachim du Bellay accompanies (and is secretary to) his cousin, Cardinal Jean du Bellay, on a visit to Rome which lasts until August 1557. In Rome, the poet continues to write works which will be published in 1558.

Awards

Works published

France
 Olivier de Magny:
 Les Amours 102 sonnets addressed to "Castianire", often identified as Louise Labe, preceded by a sonnet often attributed to her; Paris: Estienne Groulleau, France
 Hymne sur la naissance de Madame, fille du roi très chrestien Henry, Arnoul L'Angelier, Paris; France
 Pierre de Ronsard, Livret de Folâtries

Other
 Ludovico Ariosto, Carminum Lib. Quatuor, also known as Carmina, edited by Giovanni Battista Pigna
 Jami, Rose Garden of the Pious (illustrated version in the Arthur Sackler Gallery, Washington, D.C.)
 Anonymous, Pierce the Ploughmans Crede, Great Britain
 Gavin Douglas, Scottish poet (who wrote in Middle Scots):
Eneados ("Aeneid"), translated from the Latin of Virgil's Aeneid 1512–1513; with Book 13 by Maffeo Vegio; the first complete translation of any major work of classical antiquity into an Anglic language; the first printed edition, published in  London by the press of William Copland; the edition displays an anti–Roman Catholic bias, in that references (in the prologues) to the Virgin Mary, Purgatory, and Catholic ceremonies are altered or omitted; 66 lines of the translation, describing the amour of Dido and Aeneas, are omitted as indelicate.
 The Palis of Honoure,  publication year uncertain; second edition, substantially changed

Births
 March 29 – Vitsentzos Kornaros (died 1613 or 1614), Cretan poet of the Greek Renaissance, writer of the romantic epic poem Erotokritos
 John Lyly born this year or 1554 (died 1606), English writer, dramatist and poet

Deaths
 March 17 – Girolamo Fracastoro, also known as "Fracastorius" (born 1478), Italian (Venetian), physician, scholar (in mathematics, geography and astronomy), atomist and Latin-language poet
 Also:
 Erasmus Alberus (born c. 1500), German
 Hanibal Lucić died about this year (born 1485), Croatian poet and playwright
 Yamazaki Sōkan 山崎宗鑑, pen name of Shina Norishige (born 1465), Japanese renga and haikai poet, court calligrapher for Shōgun Ashikaga Yoshihisa; became a secluded Buddhist monk following the shōgun's death in 1489

See also

 Poetry
 16th century in poetry
 16th century in literature
 Dutch Renaissance and Golden Age literature
 French Renaissance literature
 Renaissance literature
 Spanish Renaissance literature

Notes

16th-century poetry
Poetry